"Til I Loved You" is a song written by Van Stephenson, Dave Robbins and Jeff Silbar, and first recorded by American singer Juice Newton for her 1983 album Dirty Looks. It was covered by Restless Heart in 1985 and released as the fourth single from their album Restless Heart in March 1986, peaking at number 10 on the Billboard Hot Country Singles & Tracks chart.

Charts

References

1983 songs
1986 singles
1992 singles
Juice Newton songs
Restless Heart songs
Songs written by Van Stephenson
Songs written by Dave Robbins (keyboardist)
Songs written by Jeff Silbar
Song recordings produced by Scott Hendricks
RCA Records singles